Predrag Počuča (born 24 January 1986) is a Croatian-Serbian football defender who most recently played for Faroese side Klaksvíkar Ítróttarfelag where his contract was ended at the end of the 2018 season.

Career
Born in Ogulin, SR Croatia, back in Yugoslavia, he played for Serbian clubs FK Železnik, FK Dorćol and FK Žarkovo, before going to Hungary to play with FC Sopron, UTA Arad and KS Besa Kavaje in Europe. In Asia, he played for the 2014 Malaysia Premier League side Sabah FA under head of coach, his compatriot, Milomir Šešlija.

References

External links
 
 Profile - Faroe Soccer

1986 births
Living people
People from Ogulin
Sport in Karlovac County
Association football central defenders
Croatian footballers
FK Železnik players
FK Dorćol players
OFK Žarkovo players
FC Sopron players
FC UTA Arad players
Besa Kavajë players
Sabah F.C. (Malaysia) players
Tampines Rovers FC players
FK BSK Borča players
FK Inđija players
FK Sinđelić Beograd players
KÍ Klaksvík players
Liga II players
Kategoria Superiore players
Singapore Premier League players
Serbian First League players
Faroe Islands Premier League players
Croatian expatriate footballers
Expatriate footballers in Hungary
Croatian expatriate sportspeople in Hungary
Expatriate footballers in Romania
Croatian expatriate sportspeople in Romania
Expatriate footballers in Albania
Croatian expatriate sportspeople in Albania
Expatriate footballers in Malaysia
Croatian expatriate sportspeople in Malaysia
Expatriate footballers in Singapore
Croatian expatriate sportspeople in Singapore
Expatriate footballers in the Faroe Islands